St. Augustine is an unincorporated community in Cecil County, Maryland, United States.

Land rights to the area were granted to merchant Augustine Herman by Lord Baltimore prior to 1686 but the Herman family was never able to lay proper claim to the title.

Great House was listed on the National Register of Historic Places in 1984.

References

Czech-American culture in Maryland
Unincorporated communities in Cecil County, Maryland
Unincorporated communities in Maryland